The economy of Sikkim, a state in northeastern India, has a significantly agricultural economy. Although having mountainous terrain, Sikkim has managed to sustain it's agricultural economy through organic farming. The state of Sikkim was declared as the only 100% organic state in 2016. Sikkim's industrial sector is also mostly agriculture based. Besides agriculture, other large industries include pharmaceuticals, ecotourism, and carpet weaving.

Agriculture
Total cropped area of Sikkim is averaged at 138,000 hectares.

In 2016, Sikkim became world's first Organic state. Also Sikkim was the first state in the world to implement 100% organic policy. Majority of Sikkim's population(around 62%) is employed Agriculture and Agriculture based sector and 80% of rural population is employed in this sector.

In 2003, Sikkim implemented 100% Organic farming and banned chemical fertilizers and pesticides. Sikkim became first Indian state to do so. In January 2016, Sikkim was awarded with prestigious Future Policy Gold Award by UN Food and Agriculture Organisation (FAO).

Sikkim is major producer of Black cardamom in India. Sikkim accounts 88% of cardamom produce of India.

Major crops of the state are, Paddy, Buck Wheat, Maize, Barley, potato.

Sikkim is known for its unique Temi Tea. Tea Board of India is considering GI tag for Sikkimese Tea.

References

Indian Economy articles needing expert attention
Agricultural economics